New Castile may refer to:

 New Castile (Spain), Spanish historic region
 Governorate of New Castile, Spanish colony 1529–1542
 Luzon, Philippine island

See also
 Castile (disambiguation)